Penn (also Lauren) is an unincorporated community in western Ramsey County, North Dakota, United States. It lies along U.S. Route 2, northwest of the city of Devils Lake, the county seat of Ramsey County.  Its elevation is 1,467 feet (447 m).  The community was first named Lauren for the townsite owner, Lauren, and was later renamed Penn for English stockholders.  It has a post office with the ZIP code 58362.

Devil's Lake

It is reported that the State and Federal Governments have bought out parts of the town because Devils Lake is expanding and will soon engulf the town with flood waters.

References

Unincorporated communities in Ramsey County, North Dakota
Unincorporated communities in North Dakota